The East Orange Oval was an athletic field located at Brick Church in East Orange, New Jersey. It was also the first known field used by the Orange Athletic Club football team. The field was also used for track and field events by the Old Brick Church of Orange, among other groups.

References
 Old Brick Church Boys Win
Orange Athletic Club All-Time Football Records

Orange/Newark Tornadoes
Defunct American football venues in the United States
American football venues in New Jersey
East Orange, New Jersey